The 1989–90 Campionato Sammarinese di Calcio season was the 5th season since its establishment. It was contested by 10 teams, and S.P. La Fiorita won the championship.

Regular season

Championship playoff

First round
F.C. Domagnano 2-2 (pen 4-6) A.C. Libertas
S.S. Montevito 0-1 S.S. Cosmos

Second round
F.C. Domagnano 1-0 S.S. Montevito
A.C. Libertas 2-1 S.S. Cosmos

Third round
F.C. Domagnano 1-2 S.S. Cosmos
A.C. Libertas 1-1 (pen 6-4) S.P. Tre Fiori

Fourth round
S.S. Cosmos 1-1 (pen 5-4) S.P. Tre Fiori
S.P. La Fiorita 4-0 A.C. Libertas

Semifinal
A.C. Libertas 1-3 S.S. Cosmos

Final
S.P. La Fiorita 1-0 S.S. Cosmos

References
San Marino - List of final tables (RSSSF)

Campionato Sammarinese di Calcio
San
Campionato